Terrell Whitehead (born September 18, 1988) is a former American football free safety. He was signed by the Jacksonville Jaguars as an undrafted free agent in 2010. He played college football at Norfolk State.

Jacksonville Jaguars
Whitehead was signed as an undrafted free agent by the Jacksonville Jaguars after the 2010 NFL Draft. Whitehead was placed on injured reserve August 9, 2010.

Personal life
He resides in Virginia Beach, Virginia. He attended Kempsville High School in Virginia Beach, Virginia. He has a son named, Tayron Kaleb.

External links
 Jacksonville Jaguars bio

Further reading

1988 births
Living people
Sportspeople from Virginia Beach, Virginia
Players of American football from Virginia
American football safeties
Norfolk State Spartans football players
Jacksonville Jaguars players